A learning management system (LMS) is a software application for the administration, documentation, tracking, reporting, automation, and delivery of educational courses, training programs, materials or learning and development programs. The learning management system concept emerged directly from e-Learning.  Learning management systems make up the largest segment of the learning system market. The first introduction of the LMS was in the late 1990s. Learning management systems have faced a massive growth in usage due to the emphasis on remote learning during the COVID-19 pandemic.

Learning management systems were designed to identify training and learning gaps, using analytical data and reporting. LMSs are focused on online learning delivery but support a range of uses, acting as a platform for online content, including courses, both asynchronous based and synchronous based. In the higher education space, an LMS may offer classroom management for instructor-led training or a flipped classroom. Modern LMSs include intelligent algorithms to make automated recommendations for courses based on a user's skill profile as well as extract metadata from learning materials to make such recommendations even more accurate.

Characteristics

Purpose
An LMS delivers and manages all types of content, including video, courses, workshops, and documents. In the education and higher education markets, an LMS will include a variety of functionality that is similar to corporate but will have features such as rubrics, teacher and instructor-facilitated learning, a discussion board, and often the use of a syllabus. A syllabus is rarely a feature in the corporate LMS, although courses may start with heading-level index to give learners an overview of topics covered.

History
There are several historical phases of distance education that preceded the development of the LMS:

The first LMS was created in 1924 when Sidney Pressey invented the first ‘teaching machine’. This machine similar to a type writer with the window showing the questions. From then on continuous technological development has contributed to vast changes to LMS with the latest update in 2012 where the LMS is hosted in a cloud, hence freeing companies from the burden of maintaining in-house systems.

Correspondence teaching 
The first known document of correspondence teaching dates back to 1723, through the advertisement in the Boston Gazette of Caleb Phillips, professor of shorthand, offering teaching materials and tutorials. The first testimony of a bi-directional communication organized correspondence course comes from England, in 1840, when Isaac Pitman initiated a shorthand course, wherein he sent a passage of the Bible to students, who would send it back in full transcription. The success of the course resulted in the foundation of the phonographic correspondence society in 1843. The pioneering milestone in distance language teaching was in 1856 by Charles Toussaint and Gustav Langenscheidt, who began the first European institution of distance learning. This is the first known instance of the use of materials for independent language study.

Multimedia teaching: The emergence and development of the distance learning idea 
The concept of e-learning began developing in the early 20th century, marked by the appearance of audio-video communication systems used for remote teaching. In 1909, E.M. Forster published his story 'The Machine Stops' and explained the benefits of using audio communication to deliver lectures to remote audiences.

In 1924, Sidney L. Pressey developed the first teaching machine which offered multiple types of practical exercises and question formats. Nine years later, University of Alberta's Professor M.E. Zerte transformed this machine into a problem cylinder able to compare problems and solutions.

This, in a sense, was "multimedia", because it made use of several media formats to reach students and provide instruction. Later, printed materials would be joined by telephone, radio broadcasts, TV broadcasts, audio, and videotapes.

The earliest networked learning system was the Plato Learning Management system (PLM) developed in the 1970s by Control Data Corporation.

Telematic teaching
In the 1980s, modern telecommunications started to be used in education. Computers became prominent in the daily use of higher education institutions, as well as instruments to student learning. Computer aided teaching aimed to integrate technical and educational means. The trend then shifted to video communication, as a result of which Houston University decided to hold telecast classes to their students for approximately 13–15 hours a week. The classes took place in 1953, while in 1956, Robin McKinnon Wood and Gordon Pask released the first adaptive teaching system for corporate environments SAKI. The idea of automating teaching operations also inspired the University of Illinois experts to develop their Programmed Logic for Automated Teaching Operations (PLATO) which enabled users to exchange content regardless of their location. In the period between 1970 and 1980, educational venues were rapidly considering the idea of computerizing courses, including the Western Behavioral Sciences Institute from California that introduced the first accredited online-taught degree.

Teaching through the internet: The appearance of the first LMS
The history of the application of computers to education is filled with broadly descriptive terms such as computer-managed instruction (CMI), and integrated learning systems (ILS), computer-based instruction (CBI), computer-assisted instruction (CAI), and computer-assisted learning (CAL). These terms describe drill-and-practice programs, more sophisticated tutorials, and more individualized instruction, respectively. The term is currently used to describe a number of different educational computer applications. FirstClass by SoftArc, used by the United Kingdom's Open University in the 1990s and 2000s to deliver online learning across Europe, was one of the earliest internet-based LMSs.

The first fully-featured Learning Management System (LMS) was called EKKO, developed and released by Norway's NKI Distance Education Network in 1991. Three years later, New Brunswick's NB Learning Network presented a similar system designed for DOS-based teaching, and devoted exclusively to business learners.

Technical aspects 
An LMS can be either hosted locally or by a vendor. A vendor-hosted cloud system tends to follow a SaaS (software as a service) model. All data in a vendor-hosted system is housed by the supplier and accessed by users through the internet, on a computer or mobile device. Vendor-hosted systems are typically easier to use and require less technical expertise. An LMS that is locally hosted sees all data pertaining to the LMS hosted internally on the users′ internal servers. Locally hosted LMS software will often be open-source, meaning users will acquire (either through payment or free of charge) the LMS software and its code. With this, the user is able to modify and maintain the software through an internal team. Individuals and smaller organizations tend to stick with cloud-based systems due to the cost of internal hosting and maintenance.

There are a variety of integration strategies for embedding content into LMSs, including AICC, xAPI (also called 'Tin Can'), SCORM (Sharable Content Object Reference Model) and LTI (Learning Tools Interoperability).

Through an LMS, teachers may create and integrate course materials, articulate learning goals, align content and assessments, track studying progress, and create customized tests for students. An LMS allows the communication of learning objectives, and organize learning timelines. An LMS perk is that it delivers learning content and tools straight to learners, and assessment can be automated. It can also reach marginalized groups through special settings. Such systems have built-in customizable features including assessment and tracking. Thus, learners can see in real time their progress and instructors can monitor and communicate the effectiveness of learning. One of the most important features of LMS is trying to create a streamline communication between learners and instructors. Such systems, besides facilitating online learning, tracking learning progress, providing digital learning tools, managing communication, and maybe selling content, may be used to provide different communication features.

Features

Managing courses, users and roles 
Learning management systems may be used to create professionally structured course content. The teacher can add, text, images, videos, pdfs, tables, links and text formatting, interactive tests, slideshows etc. Moreover, they can create different types of users, such as teachers, students, parents, visitors and editors (hierarchies). It helps control which content a student can access, track studying progress and engage student with contact tools. Teachers can manage courses and modules, enroll students or set up self-enrollment.

Online assessment 
An LMS can enable instructors to create automated assessments and assignments for learners, which are accessible and submitted online. Most platforms allow a variety of different question types such as: one/multi-line answer; multiple choice answer; ordering; free text; matching; essay; true or false/yes or no; fill in the gaps; agreement scale and offline tasks.

User feedback 
Students' exchange of feedback both with teachers and their peers is possible through LMS. Teachers may create discussion groups to allow students feedback, share their knowledge on topics and increase the interaction in course. Students' feedback is an instrument which help teachers to improve their work, helps identify what to add or remove from a course, and ensures students feel  comfortable and included.

Synchronous and Asynchronous Learning 
Students can either learn asynchronously (on demand, self-paced) through course content such as pre-recorded videos, PDF, SCORM (Sharable Content Object Reference Model) or they can undertake synchronous learning through mediums such as Webinars.

Learning Analytics 
Learning management systems will often incorporate dashboards to track student or user progress. They can then report on key items such as completion rates, attendance data and success likelihood. Utilising these metrics can help facilitators better understand gaps in user knowledge.

Learning management industry 

In the relatively new LMS market, commercial providers for corporate applications and education range from new entrants to those that entered the market in 1990. In addition to commercial packages, many open-source solutions are available.

In the U.S. higher education market as of spring 2021, the top three LMSs by a number of institutions were Canvas (38%), Blackboard (25%), and Moodle (15%). Worldwide, the picture was different, with Moodle having over 50% of the market share in Europe, Latin America, and Oceania.

Many users of LMSs use an authoring tool to create content, which is then hosted on an LMS. In some cases, LMSs that do use a standard include a primitive authoring tool for basic content manipulation. More modern systems, in particular SaaS solutions have decided not to adopt a standard and have rich course authoring tools. There are several standards for creating and integrating complex content into an LMS, including AICC, SCORM, xAPI, and Learning Tools Interoperability. However, using SCORM or an alternative standardized course protocol is not always required and can be restrictive when used unnecessarily.

Evaluation of LMSs is a complex task and significant research supports different forms of evaluation, including iterative processes where students' experiences and approaches to learning are evaluated.

Advantages and disadvantages

Advantages 
There are six major advantages of LMS which in themselves constitute the concept of LMS.

 Interoperability: Data standards on LMS allow information to be exchanged from one system to another
 Accessibility: The consistent layout using on LMS provides students with disabilities better opportunity to access web content. 
 Reusability: Reusability refers to the LMS system's ability to be reused for educational content. A critical aspect in lowering the high expenses of developing educational experiences in e-learning settings.
 Durability:  Due to the rising adoption of technology into academics, the growth of LMS market is expected to reach a CAGR of 17.1% by 2028.
 Maintenance ability: LMS allows developers to continually enhance their software and better adapt them to their user base.
 Adaptability: LMS is always improving, updating, and learning new behaviours quickly. LMS has been active since 1990s and keeps adjusting to the changing society today.

Disadvantages 
 Teachers have to be willing to adapt their curricula from face-to-face lectures to online lectures.
 There is the potential for instructors to try to directly translate existing support materials into courses which can result in very low interactivity and engagement for learners if not done well.

COVID-19 and Learning Management Systems 
The suspension of in-school learning caused by the COVID-19 pandemic started a dramatic shift in the way teachers and students at all levels interact with each other and learning materials. UNESCO estimated that as of May 25, 2020, approximately 990,324,537 learners, or  56.6% of the total enrolled students have been affected by COVID-19 related school closures. In many countries, online education through the use of Learning Management Systems became the focal point of teaching and learning. For example, statistics taken from a university’s LMS during the initial school closure period (March to June 2020) indicate that student submissions and activity nearly doubled from pre-pandemic usage levels.

Student satisfaction with LMS usage during this period is closely tied to the information quality contained within LMS modules and maintaining student self-efficacy. From the teacher perspective, a study of K-12 teachers in Finland reported high levels of acceptance for LMS technology, however, training support and developing methods for maintaining student engagement are key to long-term success. In developing nations, the transition to LMS usage faced many challenges, which included a lower number of colleges and universities using LMSs before the pandemic, technological infrastructure limitations, and negative attitudes toward technology amongst users.

See also 
 
 
 
  (e-learning)
 
  – Learning Activity Management System
 s
 
 
 
 
 Massive open online course
 Moodle
 E-learning (theory)

References

Bibliography

Further reading 
 eLearning Trends: The Future of Employee Learning in 2023. from https://www.gc-solutions.net/blog/elearning-trends-the-future-of-employee-learning-in-2023
 Connolly, P. J. (2001). A standard for success. InfoWorld, 23(42), 57-58. EDUCAUSE Evolving Technologies Committee (2003). Course Management Systems (CMS). Retrieved 25 April 2005, from http://www.educause.edu/ir/library/pdf/DEC0302.pdf
 A field guide to learning management systems. (2005). Retrieved 12 November 2006, from http://www.learningcircuits.org/NR/rdonlyres/BFEC9F41-66C2-42EFBE9D-E4FA0D3CE1CE/7304/LMS_fieldguide1.pdf
 Gibbons, A. S., Nelson, J. M., & Richards, R. (2002). The nature and origin of instructional objects. In D. A. Wiley (Ed.), The instructional use of learning objects: Online version. Retrieved 5 April 2005, from http://reusability.org/read/chapters/gibbons.doc
 Gilhooly, K. (2001). Making e-learning effective. Computerworld, 35(29), 52-53.
 Hodgins, H. W. (2002). The future of learning objects. In D. A. Wiley (Ed.), The instructional use of learning objects: Online version. Retrieved 13 March 2005, from http://reusability.org/read/chapters/hodgins.doc 
 Wiley, D. (2002). Connecting learning objects to instructional design theory: A definition, a metaphor, and a taxonomy. In D. A. Wiley (Ed.), The instructional use of learning objects: Online version. Retrieved 13 March 2005, from http://reusability.org/read/chapters/wiley.doc

Learning
Educational software
Learning management systems
Management cybernetics